Diário do Nordeste is a Brazilian newspaper published in Fortaleza, the capital of the Brazilian state of Ceará, it has been published since December 1981.

References

External links 
 Diário do Nordeste official website

Newspapers published in Brazil
Newspapers established in 1981
1981 establishments in Brazil
Mass media in Ceará
Mass media in Fortaleza